A Philippine passport is a document issued by the Government of the Philippines to citizens of the Republic of the Philippines requesting other governments to allow them to pass safely and freely. It is both a travel document and a national identity document that enables the bearer to travel internationally.

Passport offices in the Philippines are under the jurisdiction of the Office of Consular Affairs (OCA) of the Department of Foreign Affairs (DFA). These Field Offices of the DFA-OCA, also known as Passport Extension Offices and officially as DFA Consular Offices, process passport applications in select regional shopping malls across the country. In addition to the issuance of Philippine passports, these offices also provide authentification services, verification of consular record documents, accept applications for delayed registration of report of birth, marriage or death abroad and other civil registry documents in coordination with relevant Philippine Foreign Service posts, as well as provide assistance-to-nationals (ATN) services to Filipinos.

The first mall-based passport office opened in February 2012 at Pacific Mall Mandaue in Mandaue. This was followed by Robinsons Starmills in San Fernando, Pampanga and Marquee Mall in Angeles City which opened in June and July 2012, respectively. In Metro Manila, the Department of Foreign Affairs opened its first passport office at SM Megamall in Mandaluyong in August 2012.

Passport offices in the country were categorized as either Satellite Offices (SO) within Metro Manila or Regional Consular Offices (RCO) in other regions. In 2017, through Executive Order No. 45, these passport offices were reorganized under the supervision of the Assistant Secretary of the DFA-OCA and officially renamed as DFA Consular Offices (CO). Each passport office is now headed by a Philippine Foreign Service Officer (FSO) and a Philippine Foreign Service Staff Officer (FSSO).

As of March 2019, the Office of Consular Affairs operates 30 mall-based DFA COs in major cities and regional centers, including six in the capital region.

Passport offices

References

External links
 Official website of the Office of Consular Affairs of the Department of Foreign Affairs (Philippines)

Passport offices
Passport offices
Philippines